Dr. Tamás Szabó (born 2 May 1957) is a Hungarian physician and politician, member of the National Assembly (MP) for Jászberény (Jász-Nagykun-Szolnok County Constituency I) from 2010 to 2014, and also mayor of the town since 2010.

He was elected a member of the Committee on Health on 14 May 2010.

References

1957 births
Living people
20th-century Hungarian physicians
Mayors of places in Hungary
Fidesz politicians
Members of the National Assembly of Hungary (2010–2014)
People from Heves County